Losdolobus is a genus of six-eyed spiders found in Brazil belonging to the family Orsolobidae.

Species 

The known species of Losdolobus include:

 Losdolobus nelsoni Pompozzi, 2015 — Argentina
 Losdolobus opytapora Brescovit, Bertoncello & Ott, 2004 — Brazil
 Losdolobus parana Platnick & Brescovit, 1994 — Argentina
 Losdolobus xaruanus Lise & Almeida, 2006 — Brazil
 Losdolobus ybypora Brescovit, Ott & Lise, 2004 — Brazil

Curiosity 
This genus name constitutes a curiosity: the arachnologists Platnick and Brescovit wanted to honor two Argentinians who helped them, Pablo Goloboff and Martín Ramírez.  Asked to suggest a name, they proposed "losdolobus", which is drawn from the Buenos Aires argot called Lunfardo and loosely translates as "the morons".

Bibliography

Forster, R.R, Platnick, N.I. (1985): A review of the austral spider family Orsolobidae (Arachnida, Araneae), with notes on the superfamily Dysderoidea. Bulletin of the AMNH 181 PDF (147Mb!) Abstract
Griswold, C.E., Platnick, N.I. (1987): On the first African spiders of the family Orsolobidae (Araneae, Dysderoidea). American Museum Novitates 2892. (PDF 5Mb) Abstract (Afrolobus, Azanialobus)
Platnick, N.I., Brescovit, A.D. (1994): A new genus of the spider family Orsolobidae (Araneae, Dysderoidea) from Brazil. American Museum Novitates 3112 (PDF) (Abstract) (Losdolobus)

References

External links
 

Orsolobidae
Spiders of Brazil
Spiders of Argentina
Araneomorphae genera